Short Mountain is a traprock mountain located in south central Connecticut  north of the city of Meriden. It is part of the narrow Metacomet Ridge that extends from Long Island Sound near New Haven, Connecticut, north through the Connecticut River Valley of Massachusetts to the Vermont border. Short Mountain is known for its scenic cliffs, unique microclimate ecosystems, and rare plant communities. It is traversed by the  Metacomet Trail.

Geography
The Metacomet Ridge continues south from Short Mountain as the Hanging Hills and north as Ragged Mountain.

Geology and ecology
Short Mountain, like much of the Metacomet Ridge, is composed of basalt, also called traprock, a volcanic rock. The mountain formed near the end of the Triassic Period with the rifting apart of the North American continent from Africa and Eurasia. Lava welled up from the rift and solidified into sheets of strata hundreds of feet thick. Subsequent faulting and earthquake activity tilted the strata, creating the cliffs and ridgeline of Short Mountain. Hot, dry upper slopes, cool, moist ravines, and mineral-rich ledges of basalt talus produce a combination of microclimate ecosystems on the mountain that support plant and animal species uncommon in greater Connecticut. Short Mountain is also a raptor migration path. (See Metacomet Ridge for more information on the geology and ecosystem of Short Mountain).

Conservation and recreation
The 51 mile (80k) Metacomet Trail, (maintained by the Connecticut Forest and Park Association), traverses Short Mountain. The trail is used for hiking, snowshoeing and other passive pursuits; several outlooks provide views of the rural countryside below and the Hanging Hills to the north.

Most of the summit of Short Mountain is within conservation easement. In 2000, Short Mountain was included in a study by the National Park Service for the designation of a new National Scenic Trail now tentatively called the New England National Scenic Trail, which would include the Metacomet-Monadnock Trail in Massachusetts and the Mattabesett Trail and Metacomet Trail trails in Connecticut.

The Berlin Land Trust is active in the conservation of this section of the Metacomet Ridge.

See also
 Metacomet Ridge
 Adjacent summits:

References
 Farnsworth, Elizabeth J. "Metacomet-Mattabesett Trail Natural Resource Assessment."  2004. PDF wefile cited November 1, 2007.
 Connecticut Walk Book: A Trail Guide to the Connecticut Outdoors. 17th Edition. The Connecticut Forest and Park Association. Rockfall, Connecticut. Undated.
 Raymo, Chet and Raymo, Maureen E. Written in Stone: A Geologic History of the Northeastern United States. Globe Pequot, Chester, Connecticut, 1989.
 U.S. Congress New England National Scenic Trail Designation Act. 
 White, Harry. The Traprock Wilderness Recovery Strategy  Yale Forestry School.  Southington, Connecticut. Cited Dec. 19, 2007.

External links
 Connecticut Forest and Park Association
 NPS brochure for National Scenic Trail proposal.
 Berlin Land Trust

Metacomet Ridge, Connecticut
Mountains of Connecticut
Berlin, Connecticut
Southington, Connecticut
Tourist attractions in Hartford County, Connecticut
Landforms of Hartford County, Connecticut